Geodia erinacea is a species of sponge in the family Geodiidae. The species was first described by Lendenfeld in 1888. It is found in all the coastal waters of Australia.

Bibliography 
 Lendenfeld, R. von. (1888). Descriptive Catalogue of the Sponges in the Australian Museum, Sidney. (Taylor & Francis: London). i-xiv, 1-260, pls 1-12.

References

Tetractinellida
Sponges described in 1888